Carl Thomas Durham (August 28, 1892 – April 29, 1974) was an American politician who served as a member of the United States House of Representatives from North Carolina.

Early life and education 
Born in Orange County, North Carolina, Durham attended the University of North Carolina at Chapel Hill.

Career 
He was a pharmacist from 1912 to 1938. He served as a pharmacist's mate in the United States Navy from 1917 to 1918. He served as a member of the city council of Chapel Hill, North Carolina from 1924 to 1932, and of the Orange County Board of Commissioners 1932 to 1938. He served as a member of the school board of Chapel Hill, North Carolina from 1924 to 1938. He was also a trustee of the University of North Carolina.

Durham was elected as a Democrat to the Seventy-sixth and to the ten succeeding Congresses (January 3, 1939 – January 3, 1961). He served as chairman of the Joint Committee on Atomic Energy, during which time he was a signatory to the 1956 Southern Manifesto that opposed the desegregation of public schools ordered by the Supreme Court in Brown v. Board of Education. He was not a candidate for renomination in 1960 to the Eighty-seventh Congress. In 1964, retired and resided in Chapel Hill, North Carolina.

Death 
He died in Durham, North Carolina, April 29, 1974.
He was interred in Antioch Baptist Church Cemetery, Chapel Hill, North Carolina.

Sources

1892 births
1974 deaths
American pharmacists
American segregationists
United States Navy sailors
University of North Carolina at Chapel Hill alumni
Democratic Party members of the United States House of Representatives from North Carolina
20th-century American politicians
People from Orange County, North Carolina